The 2018 IFCPF CP Football World Championships was the European championship for men's national 7-a-side association football teams. IFCPF stands for International Federation of Cerebral Palsy Football. Athletes compete with a physical disability. The Championship took place in the Netherlands from 25 July to 5 August 2018.

Football 7-a-side was played with modified FIFA rules. Among the modifications were that there were seven players, no offside, a smaller playing field, and permission for one-handed throw-ins. Matches consisted of two thirty-minute halves, with a fifteen-minute half-time break. The Championships was a qualifying event for the 2019 IFCPF CP Football World Championships.

Participating teams and officials

Teams

The draw
During the draw, the teams were divided into pots because of rankings. Here, the following groups:

Squads

Group A

Group B

Venues
The venues to be used for the World Championships were located in Zeist.

Format

The first round, or group stage, was a competition between the 10 teams divided among two groups of five, where each group engaged in a round-robin tournament within itself. The two highest ranked teams in each group advanced to the knockout stage for the position one to four. The next two teams played for the position five to eight. The last teams played for the position nine to ten. Teams were awarded three points for a win and one for a draw. When comparing teams in a group over-all result came before head-to-head.

In the knockout stage there were three rounds (quarter-finals, semi-finals, and the final). The winners plays for the higher positions, the losers for the lower positions. For any match in the knockout stage, a draw after 60 minutes of regulation time was followed by two 10 minute periods of extra time to determine a winner. If the teams were still tied, a penalty shoot-out was held to determine a winner.

Classification
Athletes with a physical disability competed. The athlete's disability was caused by a non-progressive brain damage that affects motor control, such as cerebral palsy, traumatic brain injury or stroke. Athletes must be ambulant.

Players were classified by level of disability.
C5: Athletes with difficulties when walking and running, but not in standing or when kicking the ball.
C6: Athletes with control and co-ordination problems of their upper limbs, especially when running.
C7: Athletes with hemiplegia.
C8: Athletes with minimal disability; must meet eligibility criteria and have an impairment that has impact on the sport of football.

Teams must field at least one class C5 or C6 player at all times. No more than two players of class C8 are permitted to play at the same time.

Group stage
The first round, or group stage, have seen the sixteen teams divided into four groups of four teams.

Group A

Group B

Knockout stage

Semi-finals
Position 5-8

Position 1-4

Finals
Position 9-10

Position 7-8

Position 5-6

Position 3-4

Final

Statistics

Goalscorers

7 goals
  Vitalii Romanchuk
 Dillon Sheridan
 Harry Baker

6 goals
 Matt Crossen

5 goals
  Alexei Borkin
  Ivan Donenko
  Jeroen Schuitert

4 goals

  Liam Irons
  Santiago Maciá
  Gary Messett
  Dale Smith

3 goals

  Christian Eidenhardt
  Marat Eloev
  Charley Emerson
  Soslan Gazdanov
  Artem Krasylnykov
  Ryan Nolan
  Rik Rodenburg
  Jeroen Saedt
  Ivan Shkvarlo
  Daniel Sperl
  Jordan Twiss

2 goals

  Georgiy Albegov
  Anders Christiansen
  Leonid Ilyichov
  Jorn Henrik Lorenzen
  Oisin Merritt
  Pascal Odrich
  Erik Dreier Olsen
  Darragh Ruane
  Artem Sheremet
  Andrey Shimanov
  Magnus Hytholm Strand
  Aaron Tier
  Lewis Tribe
  Minne de Vos

1 goal

  Jaume Almenar
  Gerard Bambacht
  Serhii Bedenok
  Daan Dikken
  Taras Dutko
  Luke Evans
  Mario Fernández
  George Fletcher
  Roy Flier
  Mikael Jukarainen
  William Kalum
  Viacheslav Larionov
  Oliver Larsen
  Oleh Len
  Martijn Loeffen
  Jonas Malkmus
  Robin Meyer
  Harm Panneman
  Roman Pesotskiy
  Glenn Sambleben
  Aslan Tibilov

own goals

 2×  Mikael Jukarainen
  Anders Christiansen
  Matt Crossen
  Daan Dikken
  Jorn Henrik Lorenzen
  Simo Mykkänen

Ranking

See also

References

External links
 Official website
 Schedule and results
 2018 IFCPF European Championships Matches
 Cerebral Palsy International Sports & Recreation Association (CPISRA)
 International Federation of Cerebral Palsy Football (IFCPF)

2018 in association football
2018
2014–15 in Dutch football
Paralympic association football